The U.S. Post Office, located at 201 Brookside Avenue, is the main post office in Redlands, California. Locally prominent architect G. Stanley Wilson designed the post office, which was built from 1932 to 1935. While Wilson's design was primarily in the Mission Revival style, he also incorporated elements of the related Spanish Colonial Revival and Mediterranean Revival styles. The post office has an asymmetrical plan, distinguishing it from most federal buildings of the 1930s. The front entrance is marked by an arcade supported by piers. An octagonal Moorish dome marks one of the front corners; both the main building and the dome have tile roofs. Wilson used wrought iron to decorate the interior arches and service windows, an element which has not been observed in any other historic California post office.

The post office was added to the National Register of Historic Places on January 11, 1985.

See also 
List of United States post offices

References 

Redlands
Mission Revival architecture in California
Government buildings completed in 1935
National Register of Historic Places in San Bernardino County, California
Buildings and structures in Redlands, California
History of Redlands, California
1935 establishments in California